Erna Sondheim (17 February 1904 – 9 January 2008) was a German fencer. She competed in the women's individual foil event at the 1928 Summer Olympics.

See also
 List of centenarians (sportspeople)

References

External links
 

1904 births
2008 deaths
German female fencers
Olympic fencers of Germany
Fencers at the 1928 Summer Olympics
People from Starnberg (district)
Sportspeople from Upper Bavaria
German centenarians
Women centenarians